Harvey Horn (born 5 October 1995) is an English professional boxer who has held the WBO European flyweight title since 2019. As an amateur he won a silver medal in the light-flyweight division at the 2015 European Championships.

Early life
Harvey Horn was born on 5 October 1995 in London, England. His introduction to combat sports came through karate, earning a brown belt at the age of 10. Not long before turning 11, he began boxing at the Gator ABC gym in Woodford, East London. During his early years he had ambitions to follow in his father and uncle's footsteps and become a stockbroker. Winning his first national title at the age of 15 sent him closer to choosing his career path. He gained good grades from his GCSEs; an A* along with As and Bs, and stayed on for sixth form while still participating in boxing. When the decision came down to choosing between further education and boxing, he settled on boxing, saying, "When I got to Sixth Form at school, I thought, I could either go the A-Level route or maybe do a BTEC and still do the boxing. I had a meeting with the head teacher and asked if it was possible to combine them, and he said no problem. But within two weeks it was too much. Compared to the workload of the GCSEs and with the boxing training, something had to give. I chose to carry on with the boxing, do an easier BTEC and came out with three A-Level equivalents."

Amateur career
As an amateur he won the 2014 ABA Championships, a silver medal at the 2015 European Championships and gold at the European U22 Championships. He also competed at the 2015 European Games and the 2015 World Championships.

Professional career
Horn made his professional debut on 9 December 2017, scoring a third-round technical knockout (TKO) victory over Denis Bartos at the Copper Box Arena in London.

After compiling a record of 7–0 (2 KOs) he defeated Ijaz Ahmed via unanimous decision (UD) over ten rounds, capturing the vacant WBO European flyweight title on 18 November 2019 at the Hilton Hotel in London. Two judges scored the bout 97–93 while the third scored it 96–94.

Professional boxing record

References

1995 births
Living people
English male boxers
Boxers from Greater London
Light-flyweight boxers
Flyweight boxers
Southpaw boxers